Fortuna Mountain, also known as North Fortuna Mountain, is a  mountain located in Mission Trails Regional Park in San Diego, California. The mountain is the northernmost of the five peaks that dominate the center of Mission Trails Regional Park. Due to the surrounding lower mesa topography, Fortuna is easily visible to those traveling on nearby Interstate 15 through Marine Corps Air Station Miramar and those on State Route 52 over the Mission Trails Summit between San Diego and Santee, California.

Hiking 
There are several routes to the summit of North Fortuna Mountain. More popular routes being those that leave from the area around the Old Mission Dam and proceed up the saddle between North Fortuna and its smaller neighbor South Fortuna before turning to the north up the summit ridge to the North Fortuna Summit. The summit affords those that make it to the top 360-degree views of San Diego, Santee, MCAS Miramar as well as other landmarks such as Cowles Mountain to the immediate south and the Cuyamaca Peak and the Cuyamaca Mountains to the east.

References 

Mountains of San Diego County, California
Parks in San Diego
Mountains of Southern California